Autrefois, Maison Privée is a pictorial book by Bill Burke which includes an essay by Bernard B. Fall and a letter by Prince Sisowath Sirik Matak. The title means once a private house. The book refers to the prevalent reappropriation of once-private houses for municipal and government use.

References

External links
Autrefois, Maison Privee – Bill Burke with an essay by Bernard Fall Letter by Prince Sirik Matak
Autrefois, Maison Privee: book citation

Architecture books